The Spirit of Canadian Democracy is a 1945 book editted by Margaret Fairley. It has been called "a stirring canonical reconstruction of Canadian literature as popular and national resistance."

References

1945 non-fiction books
Books about Canada